Hesar-e Chupan (also Romanized as Ḩeşār-e Chūpān) is a village in Koleyn Rural District, Fashapuyeh District, Ray County, Tehran Province, Iran. At the 2006 census, its population was 23, in 4 families.

References 

Populated places in Ray County, Iran